John A. "Jack" Farrell (July 5, 1857 – February 9, 1914), also known as "Moose", was an American Major League Baseball player who played mainly second base in his 11 seasons.  Born in Newark, New Jersey, Farrell made his major league debut for the  Syracuse Stars of the National League, where he played the majority of that season, until moving onto the Providence Grays, where he played the next six seasons.  His career numbers include 877 hits in 884 games played, 23 home runs, and a .243 batting average.  In , he began the season as the player-manager for the Grays, compiling a 24 win, 27 loss record.  On August 3, Farrell quit as "captain" of the team. He was succeeded by outfielder Tom York, and the team finished the season with 23 wins against 10 losses, good for second place.

Farrell died in Cedar Grove, New Jersey at the age of 56, and was buried at the Holy Sepulchre Cemetery in East Orange, New Jersey.

See also
List of Major League Baseball player–managers

References

External links

1857 births
1914 deaths
19th-century baseball players
Baseball players from Newark, New Jersey
Major League Baseball second basemen
Syracuse Stars (NL) players
Providence Grays players
Providence Grays managers
Philadelphia Quakers players
Washington Nationals (1886–1889) players
Baltimore Orioles (AA) players
Minor league baseball managers
Syracuse Stars (minor league baseball) players
Lansing Farmers players
Portland (minor league baseball) players
Major League Baseball player-managers
Burials at Holy Sepulchre Cemetery (East Orange, New Jersey)
Somerville West Ends players